Mass No. 5 may refer to:

 Mass No. 5 (Mozart), Pastoral in G major, by Wolfgang Amadeus Mozart
 Mass No. 5 (Schubert), in A-flat major, by Franz Schubert